The 2015–16 season was Bologna Football Club 1909's first season back in Serie A after their relegation to Serie B at the end of the 2013–14 season. The club competed in Serie A, finishing 14th after an early season spent in the relegation zone, and in the Coppa Italia, where the club was disappointingly eliminated in the third round by Pavia.

Players

Squad information

Transfers

In

Loans in

Out

Loans out

Competitions

Serie A

League table

Results summary

Results by round

Matches

Coppa Italia

Statistics

Appearances and goals

|-
! colspan="14" style="background:#dcdcdc; text-align:center"| Goalkeepers

|-
! colspan="14" style="background:#dcdcdc; text-align:center"| Defenders

|-
! colspan="14" style="background:#dcdcdc; text-align:center"| Midfielders

|-
! colspan="14" style="background:#dcdcdc; text-align:center"| Forwards

|-
! colspan="14" style="background:#dcdcdc; text-align:center"| Players transferred out during the season

Goalscorers

Last updated: 24 April 2016

Clean sheets

Last updated: 1 May 2016

References

Bologna F.C. 1909 seasons
Bologna